Home Front Heroes Day is observed on May 9 to acknowledge and honor the contributions of individuals on the home front, past and present, for their support, work and sacrifices at home during the service of their family members, loved ones, and fellow Americans in the United States military.

History 
In 2019, World War II veteran John "Lucky" Luckadoo announced at the age of 97 his goal of establishing a national day of recognition, on May 9,  for home front heroes.

Luckadoo was a B-17 Flying Fortress pilot and is the last living original pilot of the World War II Eighth Air Force 100th Bomb Group, also known as The Bloody 100th. He is the subject of Damn Lucky: One Man's Courage During the Bloodiest Military Campaign in Aviation History by Kevin Mauer.

The first official recognition of the date of May 9 as Home Front Heroes Day was on May 9, 2019, in Dallas, Texas. The inaugural event was created for residents of Luckadoo's retirement community, Presbyterian Village North. Ceremonies included the presentation by Dallas City Council member Adam McGough of a proclamation from the Office of the Mayor/City of Dallas and the Dallas City Council.

On May 6, 2022, Congressman Colin Allred (D-TX-32) and Congressman Jake Ellzey (R-TX-06) introduced a bipartisan resolution supporting the effort to designate May 9 as Home Front Heroes Day.

References

External links
 100th Bomb Group

Annual events in Texas